14th Nova Scotia general election may refer to:

Nova Scotia general election, 1830, the 14th general election to take place in the Colony of Nova Scotia, for the 14th General Assembly of Nova Scotia
1920 Nova Scotia general election, the 36th overall general election for Nova Scotia, for the (due to a counting error in 1859) 37th Legislative Assembly of Nova Scotia, but considered the 14th general election for the Canadian province of Nova Scotia